Ingrid Borthen (1913–2001) was a Norwegian-born Swedish stage and film actress.   She was involved with the Dramatist Studio of Sweden in Stockholm. She was married to the actor Ulf Johanson.

Selected filmography
 The Family Secret (1936)
 Life Begins Today (1939)
 The Three of Us (1940)
 A Real Man (1940)
 The Girl and the Devil (1944)
 We Need Each Other (1944)
 Iris and the Lieutenant (1946)
 The Balloon (1946)
 The Girl from the Marsh Croft (1947)
 A Ship Bound for India (1947)
 Rail Workers (1947)
 On These Shoulders (1948)
 The White Cat (1950)
 Divorced (1951)
 The Lady in Black (1958)
 The Judge (1960)

References

Bibliography
  Cowie, Peter Françoise Buquet, Risto Pitkänen & Godfried Talboom. Scandinavian Cinema: A Survey of the Films and Film-makers of Denmark, Finland, Iceland, Norway, and Sweden. 
 Goble, Alan. The Complete Index to Literary Sources in Film. Walter de Gruyter, 1999.
 Steene, Birgitta. Ingmar Bergman: A Reference Guide. Amsterdam University Press, 2005.

External links

1913 births
2001 deaths
Swedish film actresses
Norwegian film actresses
Swedish stage actresses
Norwegian stage actresses
Norwegian emigrants to Sweden
People from Trondheim